Rasenia is an extinct ammonoid cephalopod genus belonging to the superfamily Perisphinctoidea. These fast-moving nektonic carnivores lived during the Upper Jurassic period, in the Kimmeridgian and Tithonian ages.

Etymology
This genus gets its name from Market Rasen in Lincolnshire (Midland England), place where it is frequently found.

Distribution
Fossils of species within this genus have been found in the Jurassic sediments of Russia, France and United Kingdom.

References

External links
  Twmuseum

Ammonitida genera
Perisphinctoidea
Jurassic ammonites
Ammonites of Europe
Aulacostephanidae